Petrelis is a Greek surname. Notable people with the surname include:

 Michael Petrelis (born 1959), American activist and blogger
 Thanos Petrelis (born 1975), Greek singer

Greek-language surnames